The Battle of Montjuïc took place on 26 January 1641 during the Reapers' War. A Spanish force under Pedro Fajardo launched an attack on the Catalan army led by Francesc de Tamarit, with French cavalry support. The Spanish force had recently massacred hundreds of rebels who had tried to surrender at Cambrils.

The Catalan rebels had taken up position on the heights of Montjuïc which dominated the city of Barcelona. The Spanish launched several concerted attempts to capture Montjuïc Castle, but were continually repulsed. Finally a large force of Catalan rebels counter-attacked from the direction of Barcelona. Large numbers of Spanish troops were killed and the remainder had to withdraw to Tarragona along the coast. 

Amongst those killed at the battle was John O'Neill, the exiled Earl of Tyrone, who was serving with an Irish regiment in the Spanish army.

Bibliography
 
 Serra, Eva. La guerra dels segadors. Ed. Bruguera (Barcelona, 1966)

Military history of Barcelona
Montjuïc
Montjuïc
1641 in Spain
Montjuïc